Edge of Eternity is a 2021 role-playing video game developed by Midgar Studio and published by Dear Villagers. It first released for Windows before releasing on PlayStation 4, PlayStation 5, Xbox One, Xbox Series X/S, and Nintendo Switch in February 2022.

Gameplay 
Players control Daryon, a young soldier whose world has been invaded by a technologically advanced race. When Daryon learns that his mother has been infected with an alien biological agent, he deserts his post to help his sister find a cure. Gameplay is influenced by JRPGs and includes elements of tactical role-playing games. It features hex grids and Active Time Battle, a form of turn-based combat used in the Final Fantasy series. The open world setting includes both science fiction and fantasy tropes, mixing together robots and magic.

Development 
Edge of Eternity was developed by Midgar Studio, a French studio which is named after the fictional city of the same name from the 1997 video game Final Fantasy VII. Crowdfunding was announced in 2013, and the game entered early access in November 2018. The developers cited a desire to add voice acting and hear feedback from players. The Windows version was released on June 8, 2021. Ports for the PlayStation 4, PlayStation 5, Xbox One, Xbox Series X/S and Nintendo Switch (via cloud support) was released on February 10, 2022. The game's score was composed by Cedric Menendez, with Yasunori Mitsuda providing six tracks.

Reception 

The game received "mixed or average reviews" according to Metacritic.

RPGamer said the game "comes from a place of love", but Midgar Studio was too ambitious, resulting in many features that do not live up their initial promise. Although they praised the game's "stunning backdrops", they said there is little to do in the areas, and they found the combat to be repetitive and sometimes unbalanced. The story also showed promise to them, but they found the siblings unlikable and their quest to be "an uninspired journey". Describing it as "a love letter to classic Final Fantasy and Xenoblade games", Hardcore Gamer rated it 3.5/5 stars and said that is a "a good but not great JRPG" that "comes close to reaching its ambitious goals".

References

External links 
 

2021 video games
Cloud-based Nintendo Switch games
Indie video games
Kickstarter-funded video games
Open-world video games
Nintendo Switch games
PlayStation 4 games
PlayStation 5 games
Role-playing video games
Science fantasy video games
Single-player video games
Video games set on fictional planets
Video games developed in France
Video games scored by Yasunori Mitsuda
Windows games
Xbox One games
Xbox Series X and Series S games
Dear Villagers games